Cotinga is a genus of passerine birds belonging to the cotinga family, Cotingidae. It contains seven species that are found in tropical rainforest in South and Central America from southern Mexico to south-east Brazil. They feed mainly on fruit and forage high in trees.

The males have highly colourful plumage; bright blue with areas of purple. The blue colour is produced by air bubbles in the feathers which scatter light. Females are much duller than males and are mainly brown, often with pale feather edges giving them a scaled or speckled appearance.

The wings of the males make a whistling or rattling noise in flight.

Deforestation is a threat to several members of this genus. The turquoise cotinga is classed as Vulnerable by the IUCN and the banded cotinga is considered to be Endangered.

Taxonomy
The genus Cotinga was introduced by the French zoologist Mathurin Jacques Brisson in 1760. The type species is the purple-breasted cotinga. The name is from the extinct Tupi language for a "bright forest bird".

The genus contains seven species:

References

 
Bird genera